Guido Kaschnitz von Weinberg (28 June 1890 in Vienna – 1 September 1958 in Frankfurt am Main) was an Austrian-German archaeologist and art historian. He was the husband of writer Marie Luise Kaschnitz.

He studied at the University of Vienna, where one of his influences was art historian Max Dvořák. From 1910 to 1913 he took part in excavations in Dalmatia and participated in study trips to Greece, North Africa and Egypt. In 1913 he obtained his doctorate from Vienna with a dissertation-thesis on Greek vase painting. After performing military service in World War I, he worked for several years in Munich.

From 1923 he worked in Rome, where he conducted research at the German Archaeological Institute (DAI) and cataloged ancient Greek art at the Vatican. In 1932 he was appointed professor of classical archaeology at the University of Königsberg. Later on, he held professorships at the universities of Marburg (1937–1940) and Frankfurt (1940–1956). In 1953 he was named director of the DAI in Rome, where he resumed publication of the "Römische Mitteilungen", a journal that had been in hiatus since 1944.

As an art historian, he used structure analysis (Strukturforschung) rather than the concept of style when determining works of ancient art. From a standpoint of methodology, he was the nearest follower of Alois Riegl — with his "structural analysis" being considered a form of Riegl's notion of Kunstwollen ("will to art").

Selected works 
 Bemerkungen zur Struktur der ägyptischen Plastik (1933) – Remarks on the structure of Egyptian sculpture.
 Marcus Antonius, Domitian, Christus (1938) – Mark Antony, Domitian, Jesus Christ.
 Die mittelmeerischen grundlagen der antiken kunst (1944) – The Mediterranean foundation of ancient art.
 Die Grundlagen der antiken Kunst (2 volumes, 1944) – The basics of ancient art.
 Ludwig Curtius: das wissenschaftliche Werk (1958) – Ludwig Curtius, scientific work.
 Das Schöpferische in der römischen Kunst (1961) – Creativity in Roman art.
 Römische Kunst (3 volumes, 1961; edited and published by Helga Heintze) – Roman art.
 Die Baukunst im Kaiserreich (1963; edited and published by Helga Heintze) – Architecture of the Empire.
 Ausgewählte Schriften (3 volumes, 1965; edited and published by Helga Heintze) – Selected writings.
 Kleine Schriften zur Struktur (1965; edited and published by Helga Heintze) – Smaller works on structure.
 Mittelmeerische Kunst : eine Darstellung ihrer Strukturen (1965; edited and published by Peter H. von Blanckenhagen and Helga Heintze) – Mediterranean art: a presentation of its structures.

References 

1890 births
1958 deaths
University of Vienna alumni
Academic staff of the University of Marburg
Academic staff of the University of Königsberg
Academic staff of Goethe University Frankfurt
German art historians
Archaeologists from Vienna